Ťahanovce is a borough (city ward) of the city of Košice, Slovakia.

The first written mention about Ťahanovce is dated back to 1263. It was an independent village until 1969 when it was connected with Košice. Ťahanovce is home to approximately 2,000 (prevailingly elder) people and it is closely connected with the city part Sídlisko Ťahanovce.

Some of the historical names of the village Ťahanovce

 1263 -  (according to name of person)
 1293 - possesio Thehan
 1355 - villa Techan
 1399 - Thehaan
 1773 - ; 
 1786 - ; 
 1808 - ; 
 1863, 1892 - 
 1873 - 
 1888 - 
 1907, 1938 - 
 1920, 1945 -

Statistics

 Area: 7.28 km² (2016)
 Population: 2 529 (31 December 2017)
 Density of population: 350/km² (December 2017)
 District: Košice I
 Mayor: Ing. Ján Nigut

Gallery

References

External links

 Official website of the Ťahanovce borough
 Article on the Ťahanovce borough at Cassovia.sk (in Slovak)
 Official website of Košice

Boroughs of Košice
Villages in Slovakia merged with towns